Nancy Coleman (December 30, 1912 – January 18, 2000) was an American film, stage, television and radio actress.  After working on radio and appearing on the Broadway stage, Nancy Coleman moved to Hollywood to work for Warner Bros. studios.

Early life
Coleman was born December 30, 1912, in Everett, Washington, where her father, Charles Sumner Coleman, was editor of The Daily Herald. Her mother, Grace Sharplass Coleman, was "an accomplished violinist." The family lived in Everett, Washington, where she graduated with honors from Everett High School.

She attended the University of Washington in Seattle where she majored in English and was a member of the Alpha Lambda chapter of Kappa Alpha Theta. After graduating, she was accepted at Columbia University's Teacher's College in New York. She attended the university, but dropped out, moving to San Francisco, California, where she worked as an elevator operator of a department store.

Career
Early in her career as an actress, Coleman portrayed Alice Hughes on the radio version of the soap opera Young Doctor Malone. Coleman also appeared as the lead in the 04/13/1943 episode of "Suspense", entitled "Fear Paints a Picture".  On television, she played Helen Emerson on Valiant Lady. 

Coleman's Broadway credits include Liberty Jones (1941), The Sacred Flame (1952), and The Desperate Hours (1955).

Memorable roles include playing the mistress to a Nazi (played by Helmut Dantine) in Edge of Darkness and co-starring with Paul Henreid in In Our Time. In the 1950s, Coleman began making guest appearances on television. She also played Anne Brontë in the film Devotion (1946) opposite Olivia de Havilland and Ida Lupino.

Personal life
Coleman married Whitney Bolton, a publicity director, on September 16, 1943. They remained wed until his death in 1969. She gave birth to twin girls, Charla Elizabeth and Grania Theresa, on July 13, 1944. Coleman was a Democrat who supported Adlai Stevenson in the 1952 presidential election.

Filmography

Notes

References

External links

 
 

1912 births
2000 deaths
American film actresses
American television actresses
Actresses from Washington (state)
People from Everett, Washington
20th-century American actresses
University of Washington College of Arts and Sciences alumni
Washington (state) Democrats
California Democrats
New York (state) Democrats